Lyndon Hooper (born May 30, 1966) is a Canadian former professional soccer player and former assistant coach of the Toronto Lynx soccer team of the United Soccer Leagues First Division. He was a prominent Canadian international.

Club career
Guyana-born but moving to Ottawa at age 11, Hooper turned professional in 1987 with the Ottawa Intrepid of the Canadian Soccer League. He continued to play for Wilfrid Laurier University in the autumns from 1986 to 1990 and was named second-team CIAU all-Canadian in 1986 and 1987. In 1986, he played in the National Soccer League with Toronto Blizzard. He went on to play for CSL teams the Montreal Supra, and returned to Toronto Blizzard in 1990.

The 5'8, 160 lbs. Hooper played in the Football League with Birmingham City in the 1993–94 season. His first game for Birmingham City was on 6 October 1993; a second city derby away at Aston Villa where Birmingham lost 1–0. Hooper returned to North America to play for A-League teams the Montreal Impact from 1994 to 1998, Hampton Roads Mariners in 1999, and Toronto Lynx, retiring as a player with the Lynx in 2001. Hooper played amateur soccer for Scarborough GS United in the 2005–06 season. The team won the Senior (open age) Men's Canadian Club Championship.

International career
Hooper is the sixth most capped player in the history of the Canadian national team, having made 68 'A' team appearances (scoring 2 goals) between 1986 and 1997. He made his debut for Canada in an August 1986 Merlion Cup match against Singapore. He represented Canada in 18 FIFA World Cup qualification matches. His final international was a June 1997 World Cup qualification match against Costa Rica.
He also represented Canada at the inaugural 1989 FIFA Futsal World Championship.

Post-retirement
When he retired from soccer he served as a sports consultant with the Toronto Sports Council and earned his Level "B" coaching license while coaching the U17 Ontario Provincial Team. On March 3, 2005 he was appointed the new assistant coach for the Toronto Lynx, under Hubert Busby Jr. But when the Lynx finished with a league worst 3 wins, 17 losses, and 8 ties, the worst performance in league history, he and Busby both left their coaching roles after one season with the club.

Hooper has recently started an elite soccer camp in the Durham Region of Ontario where he resides. The soccer camp has embarked on its journey to building a new generation of Canadian homegrown talent.

Personal life
Hooper's sister is star soccer player Charmaine Hooper and Ian Hooper, a former professional and collegiate soccer player at NC State and current Director of Business Operations for the Ottawa Champions Baseball Club. Hooper is married to Jennifer Beckford and has two kids, Trey and Taylor Hooper. He was born and raised in Georgetown, Guyana then moved to Canada in 1978.

Career statistics
Scores and results list Canada's goal tally first.

External links
 / Canada Soccer Hall of Fame

References

1966 births
Living people
Sportspeople from Georgetown, Guyana
Soccer players from Ottawa
Guyanese emigrants to Canada
Naturalized citizens of Canada
Wilfrid Laurier Golden Hawks soccer players
Black Canadian soccer players
Association football midfielders
Canadian soccer players
Canada men's international soccer players
Canadian expatriate soccer players
Canadian expatriate sportspeople in the United States
1993 CONCACAF Gold Cup players
1996 CONCACAF Gold Cup players
Ottawa Intrepid players
Montreal Supra players
Toronto Blizzard (1986–1993) players
Birmingham City F.C. players
Montreal Impact (1992–2011) players
Cincinnati Silverbacks players
Virginia Beach Mariners players
Toronto Lynx players
Canadian National Soccer League players
Canadian Soccer League (1987–1992) players
English Football League players
National Professional Soccer League (1984–2001) players
USL First Division players
Afro-Guyanese people
Expatriate footballers in England
Expatriate soccer players in the United States
Canadian soccer coaches
A-League (1995–2004) players
Canadian expatriate sportspeople in England